The Robinson House is a historic guest house located at the junction of Naamans Road (Delaware Route 92) and The Kings Highway (now U.S. Route 13,  Philadelphia Pike) in Claymont, Delaware, in the United States.  It was built in 1723, on the site of the original settlement on Naaman's Creek.  The Block House, which stands a few yards northeast of the Robinson House, is the only remaining building from the original 1654 settlement.

George Washington, General Anthony Wayne, the Marquis de Lafayette, and "Light Horse" Harry Lee were all guests at the Robinson House.  From 1914 to 1964, the Robinson House was home to the Naamans Tea House.

The Robinson House is currently the home of the Claymont Historical Society, the Darley Society, and the Naamans Heritage Association.

Gallery

References

External links 

Hotel buildings on the National Register of Historic Places in Delaware
Museums in New Castle County, Delaware
Historic house museums in Delaware
Restaurants in Delaware
Hotels in Delaware
Houses in New Castle County, Delaware
Historic American Buildings Survey in Delaware
National Register of Historic Places in New Castle County, Delaware
Houses completed in 1723